Bien-Aimé was a 58-gun ship of the line of the French Navy.

Construction 
Bien-Aimé was built for the French East India Company.

Career
Bien-Aimé  departed for the Indian Ocean on 3 May 1757.

She took part in the Battle of Cuddalore on 29 April 1758, during the Seven Years' War, under Captain Bouvet. Bien-Aimé fought the lead ship of the English line.  After the battle, a gust threw Bien-Aimé on the coast. She proved impossible to refloat and became a total loss.

Sources and references 
 Notes

Citations

References
 

Ships of the line of the French Navy
1756 ships
Ships built in France
Maritime incidents in 1758